Crêts en Belledonne (literally Crests in Belledonne) is a commune in the Isère department of southeastern France. The municipality was established on 1 January 2016 and consists of the former communes of Saint-Pierre-d'Allevard and Morêtel-de-Mailles.

See also 
Communes of the Isère department

References 

Communes of Isère